Midnight Moonlight is a solo album by pianist Duke Jordan recorded in 1979 and released on the Danish SteepleChase label.

Reception

AllMusic awarded the album 2½ stars.

Track listing
All compositions by Duke Jordan
 "Midnight Moonlight"- 5:03
 "Dance in Plaid" - 2:44
 "Wait and See" - 4:33
 "Mellow Mood" - 3:05
 "Yes I Will" - 2:22
 "Table Chess" - 2:39
 "Orange Mist" - 3:15
 "Gabrielle's Wish" - 3:06
 "Jordanish" - 3:15
 "Swedish Honey" - 3:17
 "Danish Pastry" - 3:22
 "St. Germain" - 3:57

Personnel
Duke Jordan - piano

References

1981 albums
Duke Jordan albums
Solo piano jazz albums
SteepleChase Records albums